An indirect presidential election was held to choose the President of the United Nations General Assembly on 8 June 2012 to replace Nassir Abdulaziz Al-Nasser and preside over the Sixty-seventh session of the United Nations General Assembly. It was the rotational turn of the Eastern European Group to preside over the session.

Vuk Jeremić is elected with 99 votes for and 85 votes against. This was the first time since 1991 that there was no consensus candidate from the regional grouping, thus invoking a secret ballot vote.

Background

Though there is usually a consensus candidate from the rotational group which is scheduled to hold he post of president of the UNGA, if there is no consensus candidate then a vote is held by secret ballot.

Electorate
The Eastern European Group is the smallest of the UN regional groups with 23 members who are informally entitled to choose a candidate from within their group. Failure to do so would result in a secret ballot amongst the entire United Nations General Assembly (the last time this happened was in 1991 when the Asian Group failed to agree on a candidate out of three options).

Election

Reactions
After his election, Jeremić traveled to China and met vice-president Xi Jinping. In his acceptance speech, Jeremic said:

References

External links
 Official election website of Amb. Cekuolis

United Nations General Assembly President
Presidents of the United Nations General Assembly
2012 in international relations
United Nations General Assembly elections